The Stars Art Group or simply "The Stars" (Xīngxīng 星星) was a Chinese avant-garde group of non-professional artists in the late 1970s and early 1980s (the exact interval usually given as 1979 to 1983). It was founded by Ma Desheng and Huang Rui and included Wang Keping (王克平), Qu Leilei, Ah Cheng, Ai Weiwei, and Li Shuang (artist) as the only female member. A historically significant exhibition, now called the Star Art Exhibition, took place in late 1979 in Beihai Park, Beijing,  outside the China Art Gallery. After the exhibition was closed by officials, the group staged a protest for cultural openness. They succeeded in reopening the exhibition. The exhibition took place between 23 November and 2 December, in which around 200,000 people attended the event. The group organized another exhibition the next year. Around and after 1983, the group disbanded, partly due to their members going into exile under political pressure, especially the Anti-Spiritual Pollution Campaign of 1983.  

The Stars Art Group was a foundational movement of the contemporary Chinese avant-garde active in the late 1970s and early 1980s. Mostly self-trained, the Stars championed individualism and freedom of expression both in their work and public activities. Taking personal experience and social issues as their subject matter, they pointedly diverged from state-sanctioned Socialist Realism. The group's  member artists also included affiliates Zhang Hongtu and Zhang Wei, Yan Li, Yang Yiping, Qu Leilei, Mao Lizi, Bo Yun, Zhong Ahcheng, Shao Fei, and Ma Desheng.

See also
Culture of the People's Republic of China
Chinese intellectualism
The Fifth Modernization
Chinese democracy movement
1989 Tiananmen Square protests

References

Chinese contemporary art
Chinese artist groups and collectives